Battle of Damasak took place on the 18 March 2015 when Nigerien and Chadian armies attacked Boko Haram the Nigerian town of Damasak. Boko Haram was pushed out of the town after less than a day of heavy fighting. Damasak was captured on the 24th of November 2014 by Boko Haram and was under their control until this battle. By the time the town was recaptured it had been mostly deserted..The civilians who remained were too old or too sick to leave. After the battle Chadian soldiers set up camps outside of the town and two Chadian helicopters arrived with supplies.

On 20 March, two days after the battle, Nigerien and Chadian soldiers discovered a mass grave of over 90 people under the bridge in the outskirts of the city. Civilian bodies were partially mummified by desert air, which suggested that the massacre took place some time ago.

References 

Conflicts in 2015
Conflicts in Nigeria
Boko Haram
Battles in 2015